Songs for Siigoun is an EP by Canadian singer-songwriter Jenn Grant, released in 2010. The EP, originally recorded as a gift for her fiancé Daniel Ledwell's newborn niece Siigoun, was released to online music stores such as iTunes, as well as in a limited edition CD version with individually hand-painted covers, which was sold exclusively at Grant's live shows.

The EP features covers of John Denver's "Annie's Song" and Tanya Davis' "Gorgeous Morning", as well as two original songs.

Track listing
 "Annie's Song"
 "Back to the Country"
 "Gorgeous Morning"
 "Let's Get Started"

References

2010 EPs
Jenn Grant albums